The NCAA Division III men's basketball tournament (officially styled as "Championship" instead of "Tournament") is a tournament to determine the NCAA Division III national champion. It has been held annually from 1975 to 2019 & since 2022, but not played in 2020 and 2021 due to COVID-19 issues.

From 1996 to 2012 and 2014 to 2018, the NCAA Division III men's basketball championship was held at the Salem Civic Center in Salem, Virginia. The event had been hosted by the Old Dominion Athletic Conference and the City of Salem. From 2017 to 2020 & since 2022, the tournament has been a 64-team single-elimination tournament, with teams advancing from four sectionals to the semifinals and final in Fort Wayne.

For 2013, as part of the celebration of the 75th NCAA Division I tournament, the championship games in both the NCAA Division II and Division III tournaments were played at Philips Arena, now known as State Farm Arena, in Atlanta. From 2014 to 2018, the final game returned to Salem. Currently, the Final Four is held in Fort Wayne, Indiana at Allen County War Memorial Coliseum. For 2020 only, the national semifinals were to be played in Fort Wayne, but the championship game was to have returned to Atlanta, with the NCAA choosing to hold the championship games of both Divisions II and III as part of the festivities surrounding the men's Division I Final Four; however, the NCAA decided to abandon the tournament after the second round, 16 teams remaining. The NCAA also canceled the 2021 tournament after a majority of D-III conferences chose not to play due to continued COVID-19 issues.  Of teams and conferences that played, D3Hoops' top two ranked teams, No. 1 Randolph-Macon College and No. 2 Trine University, opted to play a self-organised mythical national championship game.  Randolph-Macon won, 69-55.

Christopher Newport is the most recent national champion, beating Mount Union 74–72 to win the 2023 championship.

Qualification
Since 2021–22, a total of 64 bids have been available for each tournament: 
44 automatic bids, awarded to the champions of all Division III conferences.
20 at-large bids.

Conference tournaments
Schools in italics are, as of the current 2022–23 basketball season, no longer members of that specific conference.

Summary

Source: 
Notes

Locations
Reading, Pennsylvania 1975–1976
Rock Island, Illinois 1977–1981
Grand Rapids, Michigan 1982–1988
Springfield, Ohio 1989–1992
Buffalo, New York 1993–1995
Salem, Virginia 1996-2018 (semifinals only in 2013)
Atlanta 2013 (championship game only)
Fort Wayne, Indiana 2019, 2022–

Championships, by team

Schools in italics no longer compete in NCAA Division III.

Programs with at least 20 appearances in the Division III tournament

 List below only includes teams that are currently in Division III.

See also
 NCAA Division III women's basketball tournament
 NCAA Division I men's basketball tournament
 NCAA Division II men's basketball tournament
 NAIA men's basketball tournament

References

External links
 Awards history through 2020-2021 (Archived)
 Coaching records through 2020-2021 (Archived)
 Attendance records through 2020-2021 (Archived)

 
Recurring sporting events established in 1975